HRT may refer to:

Health and medicine 
 Habit reversal training
 Heart rate turbulence
 Hormone replacement therapy, a treatment used to reduce symptoms associated with menopause
 Transgender hormone therapy, also known as hormone replacement therapy
 Humane Research Trust, a British medical research charity
 Heidelberg Retinal Tomography, a diagnostic procedure that produces three-dimensional images of the optic nerve

Motor racing 
 Haupt Racing Team, a German auto racing team
 HRT Formula 1 Team, now defunct
 Walkinshaw Andretti United, an Australian motor racing team that previously traded as the Holden Racing Team

Transport 
 Hampton Roads Transit, in the Norfolk-Virginia Beach, United States metro area
 Hartwell Railroad, in Georgia, United States
 Heavy rail transit
 Helsinki Regional Transport Authority
 Hertfordshire Rail Tours, a defunct British railway company
 Hiroshima Rapid Transit, in Japan
 Honolulu Rail Transit, an under-construction light rail project in Hawaii
 Hurlburt Field, a United States Air Force field in Florida, United States
 RAF Linton-on-Ouse, a Royal Air Force station in England (IATA code: HRT)

Other uses 
 Hard real-time, in computing
 Hértevin language, spoken in Turkey
 Hertfordshire, county in England, Chapman code
 High rising terminal, a feature of speech
 Hostage Rescue Team, the FBI's elite tactical unit
 Hrvatska radiotelevizija, Croatia's national broadcaster
 Hudson River Trading, an American trading firm
 Hydraulic retention time, in hydrology